Gustakh previously titled Shaam Se Pehlay is a Pakistani television drama serial, produced under the banner of Aijaz Aslam's production house, Ice Entertainment & Media. It is written by Saima Akram Chudhery of Suno Chanda fame and directed by Najaf Bilgrami. It stars Faysal Quraishi, Yashma Gill, Faryal Mehmood, Jinaan Hussain and Muhammad Faizan Sheikh. It aired on Express Entertainment from July 2020 to January 2021.

Cast 
Faysal Quraishi as Rohail
Yashma Gill as Aaniya
Faryal Mehmood as Muntaha
Jinaan Hussain as Arisa
Muhammad Faizan Sheikh as Shahmeer
Ali Ansari as Emaad
Mariam Mirza as Gulnaz
Gul-e-Rana as Iffat
Jahanara Hai as Jalil's mother	
Tanveer Jamal as Jalil
Tariq Jameel

References

External links 
 

Pakistani drama television series
2020 Pakistani television series debuts